Off to the Races is a 1937 American comedy film directed by Frank R. Strayer and written by Robert Ellis and Helen Logan. The film stars Slim Summerville, Jed Prouty, Shirley Deane, Spring Byington, Russell Gleason and Kenneth Howell. The film was released on February 5, 1937, by 20th Century Fox.

Plot
Uncle George and daughter Winnie Mae turn up just as the Jones family is preparing for the county fair. The irresponsible George is going to enter his horse, Jimmy B, in the big harness race at the fair and encourages everybody to bet money on him to win.

John Jones doesn't care for horses or his wife Louise's uncle much. Their daughter Bonnie is bringing boyfriend Herbert Thompson to the fair. Herbert needs money to get married and bets every cent he has on Jimmy B, but on race day, Uncle George is hauled off to jail for failure to pay his ex-wife's alimony. John Jones reluctantly agrees to ride the horse, just to get Uncle George out of jail and out of his hair. With a little luck, the race is won.

Cast 
Slim Summerville as Uncle George
Jed Prouty as John Jones
Shirley Deane as Bonnie Jones
Spring Byington as Louise Jones
Russell Gleason as Herbert Thompson
Kenneth Howell as Jack Jones
George Ernest as Roger Jones
June Carlson as Lucy Jones
Florence Roberts as Granny Jones
Billy Mahan as Bobby Jones
Ann Gillis as Winnie Mae
Fred Toones as Ebbie
Chick Chandler as Spike
Ruth Gillette as Rosabelle

References

External links
 

1937 films
American comedy films
1937 comedy films
20th Century Fox films
Films directed by Frank R. Strayer
American black-and-white films
1930s English-language films
1930s American films